Krym is a railway station that is located in the city of Kerch in Crimea, a territory recognized by a majority of countries as part of Ukraine, but de facto under control and administration of Russia.

The station is an important transportation hub. The station serves passengers and freight trains. Among the services provided at the station is only embarkment and disembarkment of passengers for commuter and regional lines. In a close vicinity is located Port Krym where trains are being transported by ferry.

See also
 Port Kavkaz railway station

References

External links
 Krym railway station

Buildings and structures in Kerch
Railway stations in Crimea